Podjelše is a small settlement between Mekinje and Godič in the Municipality of Kamnik in the Upper Carniola region of Slovenia.

References

External links

Podjelše on Geopedia

Populated places in the Municipality of Kamnik